The Council for Wales and Monmouthshire was an appointed advisory body announced in 1948 and established in 1949 by the UK government under Labour prime minister Clement Attlee, to advise the government on matters of Welsh interest.  It was dissolved with the establishment of the post of Secretary of State for Wales and the formation of the Welsh Office in 1964/65.  It was generally known as the "Council for Wales" or, occasionally but even less correctly, the "Council of Wales".

History

Formation
The formation of the Council was partially in response to Plaid Cymru's growing influence following the Second World War. Devolution of powers to Wales was opposed by Labour politicians such as Aneurin Bevan, Morgan Phillips and Clement Attlee, who opposed the establishment of a post of Secretary of State for Wales as it would encourage Welsh nationalism. Bevan, the most influential and outspoken Welsh MP of his day, believed any form of devolution would distract Wales from the political mainstream of UK politics and be detrimental to the country's interests. However, Welsh backbenchers such as D. R. Grenfell, W. H. Mainwaring and James Griffiths supported the establishment of a Secretary of State post.  As a compromise, the Government agreed to the establishment of a Council for Wales and Monmouthshire. However, it was given no more than a responsibility to advise the UK government on matters of Welsh interest.

The proposal to set up a Council for Wales and Monmouthshire was announced in the House of Commons on 24 November 1948.  Its inaugural meeting was in May 1949, and its first business meeting the following month. Its terms of reference were:
to meet from time to time and at least quarterly for the interchange of views and information on development and trends in the economic and cultural fields in Wales and Monmouthshire; and
to ensure the government is adequately informed of the impact of government activities on the general life of the people of Wales and Monmouthshire.

The Council had 27 appointed members.  Of these, 12 were nominated by Welsh local authorities; there were also nominees from the Joint Education Committee, the University of Wales, the National Eisteddfod Council, the Welsh Tourist and Holidays Board, and from both management and union sides of Welsh industry and agriculture.  The chairman was Huw T. Edwards, a trade union leader.  The Council met in private, a further source of controversy. It set up various panels and committees to investigate issues affecting Wales, including a Welsh Language Panel to study and report upon the present situation of the language; a Government Administration Panel; an Industrial Panel; a Rural Development Panel; a Transport Panel; and a Tourist Industry Panel.

Dissolution
With the failure of unanimous Welsh political opposition to prevent the flooding of Capel Celyn, and subsequent growth in Plaid Cymru influence in the 1950s, the Council for Wales recommended the creation of a Welsh Office and Secretary of State for Wales early in 1957, at time when the governance of Wales on a UK national level was so demonstrably lacking in many people's eyes.  However, council chairman and one time Plaid Cymru critic Huw T. Edwards did not believe the Council went far enough. Edwards and four other members of the Council for Wales resigned in 1958 over what Edwards described as "Whitehallism."  Later that year Edwards joined Plaid Cymru.   The Council became moribund, but retained a formal status until 1966.

Responding to the calls of Welsh devolution,  by 1964 the Labour Government gave effect to Council for Wales proposals by establishing the post of Secretary of State for Wales and the Welsh Office.

References 

Politics of Wales
Government of Wales
History of Monmouthshire